Air Commodore Arthur Edmond Clouston,  (7 April 1908 – 1 January 1984) was a British test pilot and senior Royal Air Force officer who took part in several air races and record-breaking flights in the 1930s.

Early life
Arthur Clouston was born on 7 April 1908 at Motueka, New Zealand, the eldest of nine children of mining engineer Robert Edmond Clouston (1874–1961) and his wife Ruby Alexander Scott (1886–1943). As a teenager, Arthur developed engineering and practical country skills, and established a business repairing and reselling motor cars. His ambition was to be a master mariner, but that was abandoned due to incurable seasickness.

He was inspired by the expansion of aviation, and particularly the pioneering flights in Australia and New Zealand by aviators such as Charles Kingsford Smith and C.W.A. Scott in the late 1920s. He learned to fly at the Marlborough Aero Club at Omaka Aerodrome, near Blenheim. In 1930, after failing his attempt to join the Royal New Zealand Air Force, he moved to the United Kingdom.

RAF career, 1930–1935
In 1930, after arriving in England, Clouston found that there was a waiting list to join the RAF, so he then joined Fairey Aviation Company as a working student. Applications to the RAF were repeatedly halted, until it was found that his blood pressure was lower during flying than while awaiting medical examinations on the ground. In October 1930, he joined No. 3 FTS at RAF Spitalgate, where he went solo after about two hours flying. In April 1931, he was posted as pilot officer to No. 25 Squadron at RAF Hawkinge, flying Hawker Fury I fighter biplanes.

In April 1932, he was promoted to flying officer. He was one of the team that performed formation aerobatics, including loops, with nine Furies at the April 1934 RAF display at RAF Hendon. In August 1934, he was posted to No. 24 Squadron at Hendon. In October 1935, he declined to renew his short service commission, and left the RAF, although remaining as a Reserve Air Force Officer (RAFO) pilot with the RAFVR.

Civilian flight testing, 1935–1939
In October 1935, Clouston accepted the offered post of civilian test pilot at RAE Farnborough. Soon after he had started flying a Cierva C.30 autogiro at Farnborough, he was invited by Raoul Hafner to carry out test flying of the Hafner AR.III in his off-duty time, and Clouston later flew demonstrations of that gyroplane at many aviation events. He conducted official flight test aerodynamics work on aircraft including Parnall Parasol and Miles Falcon; ice formation research on Airspeed Courier, Handley Page Heyford and Northrop Gamma; and anti-intruder wire strike tests with Miles Hawk and Fairey P.4/34. In January 1938, he was awarded the Air Force Cross.

In October 1938, Air Vice Marshal Arthur Tedder asked Clouston to conduct test flying of the prototype of the Westland Whirlwind, in place of Westland test pilots. Clouston piloted its first flight from Yeovil Aerodrome to Boscombe Down.

Races and record-breaking flights, 1935–1939

While employed at RAE, Clouston developed a spare time interest in civil aviation, air racing and record-breaking. On 13 April 1936, he displayed his Aeronca C-3 (G-ADYP) at the Pou-du-Ciel (Flying Flea) rally at Ashingdon. He test flew several Flying Fleas from Heston Aerodrome and from Gravesend Aerodrome. On 30 May 1936, he flew his Aeronca C-3 from Hanworth Aerodrome in the London to Isle of Man Race, but missed the final turning point in fog. On 14 June 1936, he flew the Aeronca in the South Coast Race at Shoreham, and came first, but was then disqualified on a technicality. On 11 July 1936, he flew a Miles Falcon (G-AEFB) in the King's Cup Race at Hatfield. On 3 August 1936, he borrowed a Flying Flea (G-ADPY), and raced it in the First International Flying Flea Challenge Trophy Race at Ramsgate Airport, but retired when an oil pipe fractured.

On 29 September 1936, he took off from Portsmouth Airport in his Miles Hawk Speed Six (G-ADOD), at the start of the Schlesinger Race to Johannesburg. He was one of nine starters, but force landed 200 miles short of the race destination, and was the last of eight entries that failed to reach Johannesburg. On 29 May 1937, he flew a Miles Hawk Major (G-ADGE) from Hanworth in the London to Isle of Man Race.

In June 1937, he learned that the DH.88 Comet (G-ACSS), that won the 1934 MacRobertson Race, was for sale by a scrap dealer, after it had been damaged in Air Ministry testing. He persuaded architect Fred Tasker to purchase the Comet, and then arranged for it to be repaired with upgraded engines and propellers, by Jack Cross of Essex Aero at Gravesend Aerodrome. He entered the Comet for the planned 1937 New York to Paris air race, but the US Department of Commerce refused all necessary permissions for the race.

The French government reorganised the race to run from Istres Airfield near Marseille, via Damascus, to Paris. The only inscriptions on the Comet were the registration and race number "G-16", but it was also nicknamed "The Orphan" to reflect the lack of sponsors. On 20 August 1937, accompanied by Flt Lt George Nelson as co-pilot of the Comet, Clouston took off from Istres as one of 13 entrants, of which all the others were more powerful, and all heavily sponsored by European governments. He arrived at Le Bourget in fourth position, a few minutes behind the Savoia-Marchetti S.73 of Bruno Mussolini.

In 1937, Clouston broke the record for a return flight from England to Cape Town. Betty Kirby-Green was relatively new to flying, with an appetite for adventure, and agreed to help raise money for an attempt on the Cape record set by Amy Johnson in 1936. Burberry sponsored the flight and provided Burberry flying clothing, and their DH.88 Comet, G-ACSS was consequently named renamed "The Burberry". On 14 November 1937, Clouston and Kirby-Green took off from Croydon Aerodrome, and reached Cape Town on 16 November in a record 45 hours and two minutes. Their return journey of 57 hours and 23 minutes was also record-breaking. The DH.88 Comet has since been restored, and is now held at the Shuttleworth Collection.

On 20 November, they arrived back at Croydon in dense fog, having broken several records and covered about 14,690 miles in less than six days. As a result, Clouston was awarded the Britannia Trophy and the Segrave Trophy, and Betty was awarded the Segrave Medal.

On 4 December 1937, Clouston married Elsie Turner, the daughter of engineer Samuel Turner of Farnborough; they subsequently had two daughters.

In December 1937, Daily Express air correspondent Victor Ricketts proposed to Clouston that they should attempt to break the England to Australia flight record. Ricketts arranged for sponsorship from the Australian Consolidated Press, and once again the DH.88 Comet G-ACSS was hired. It was overhauled and equipped with a small typewriter to compile press reports in flight for dispatch at refuelling stops. It was named "Australian Anniversary", representing the 150th anniversary of Australia.

On 6 February 1938, Clouston and Ricketts took off from Gravesend Aerodrome. The first scheduled stop was to be Aleppo in Syria, but bad storms forced Clouston to land at a flooded airfield at Adana in Turkey. His permits were dismissed by Turkish officials, but next day he refuelled with unofficial help, and took off from a roadway, although damaging the undercarriage. He flew to an unmarked airfield on Cyprus, having abandoned the record attempt. Engineer Jack Cross, plus the financier and some equipment, was flown to Cyprus by Alex Henshaw in a Vega Gull borrowed from Charles Gardner. After repairs to the Comet, Clouston flew it back to Gravesend, accompanied by Jack Cross.

On 15 March 1938, Clouston once again departed from Gravesend with Victor Ricketts in DH.88 Comet G-ACSS. He flew via Cairo, Basra, Allahabad, Penang and Singapore to Darwin, but without beating the 1934 record set by C. W. A. Scott and Tom Campbell Black in the same aircraft. He flew on to Sydney via Charleville, without being aware of the London to Sydney record, until massive crowds welcomed him there as a record-breaker. The next day, 20 March 1938, he flew across the Tasman Sea to Blenheim Municipal Aerodrome (Omaka) in New Zealand, setting more records. He then flew back to Australia, and continued on a return flight to Croydon, arriving in fog on 26 March 1938. He had established eleven records at the end of a round-trip of about 26,000 miles.

On 2 July 1938, he flew BA Eagle 2 (G-AFIC) in the King's Cup Race at Hatfield Aerodrome, but was placed outside the top three.

Second World War
On 1 October 1939, Clouston rejoined the RAF, and served as a test pilot with the rank of flight lieutenant and acting squadron leader, in the Aerodynamics Flight at Farnborough. His activities included test flying of radio-controlled Airspeed Queen Wasp target drones. In June 1941, he was promoted to squadron leader. Although the unit operated some high speed fighters, it was forbidden to arm their weapons, but Clouston chased intruding German aircraft without damaging them.

Increasing incursions led to orders to arm the fighters, and Clouston then claimed a shoot-down of a Heinkel 111 and a Messerschmitt Bf 110 during the same flight in a Spitfire. He carried out many flight tests using both tethered and untethered flares launched from a Handley Page Hampden flying behind a Whitley bomber, in experiments to illuminate target aircraft at night. He also flew tests with a Douglas Havoc, dispensing flash flares. In April 1941, he was attached to No. 219 Squadron, operating Beaufighters from RAF Redhill, to experience night fighter tactics. His reports to the Air Ministry led to improvements to cannons on Beaufighters, and better training for radar operators.

On 12 May 1941, he was posted as CO of No. 1422 Flight RAF of the RAE based at RAF Heston. There he carried out testing of the Turbinlite concept of an aerial searchlight mounted on a Havoc night fighter, in collaboration with Group Captain William Helmore and with aeronautical engineer L.E. Baynes, nicknamed "The Baron", for whom he had great admiration. The next experiments involved dropping coils of wire suspended from parachutes, intended to interfere with the operation of intruding aircraft. Clouston conducted another trial instigated by Helmore, involving radio control of a full-size motor launch boat from a high-flying aircraft, using a Douglas DB-7 Havoc. He was also involved in testing the Leigh Light, an aerial searchlight designed to illuminate submarines and surface vessels, and trialled on a Vickers Wellington.

In March 1943, Clouston was promoted to wing commander, and posted to command No. 224 Squadron firstly at RAF Beaulieu, then in April 1943 at RAF St Eval. The squadron was mainly involved in anti-submarine operations in the Bay of Biscay, operating B-24 Liberators with airborne radar and depth charges, later supplemented with Leigh lights. The Liberators were often attacked by formations of Bf 110s and Junkers Ju 88s, and in October 1943 Clouston was awarded the Distinguished Flying Cross for his actions, followed in April 1944 by the Distinguished Service Order.

In February 1944, he was promoted to group captain, and posted as commanding officer of RAF Langham, that was still under construction. Operations there started with No. 455 Squadron and No. 489 Squadron, both flying Beaufighters on anti-shipping missions in the North Sea area. In October 1944, the Beaufighter squadrons were replaced by No. 521 Squadron with Lockheed Hudsons and No. 524 Squadron with Wellingtons.

Postwar
In May 1945, Clouston was posted as CO of German airstrip B151 that was being developed into the headquarters of BAFO (British Air Forces of Occupation), and named RAF Bückeburg. In April 1946, he was appointed to a permanent commission with his existing rank of squadron leader. However, he was then offered the job of Director General of Civil Aviation of New Zealand. Instead of being released by the RAF, he was promoted to group captain, and given a two-year posting as commanding officer of RNZAF Base Ohakea, the main RNZAF strike base, operating de Havilland Mosquitos.

In February 1950, he was posted as CO at RAF Leeming, then in July 1953 as commandant of ETPS (Empire Test Pilot School) at Farnborough. (P. L. Runciman asserts that he was Commandant of the ETPS earlier. On 12.12.1950 he signed his father's log book as Commandant of the ETPS) In October 1953, he was posted as SASO (Senior Air Staff Officer) at No. 19 Group, RAF Coastal Command. In July 1954, he was promoted to acting air commodore, then posted as Air Officer Commanding Singapore. In 1957, he was appointed a Companion of the Order of the Bath, and was given his final posting as commandant of Aeroplane and Armament Experimental Establishment at Boscombe Down.

On 7 April 1960, Arthur Clouston retired to Cornwall, and died on 1 January 1984.

Notes

Bibliography
Clouston, A.E. 1954. The Dangerous Skies. Cassell ASIN B0000CIX25
Henshaw, Alex. "Obituary – Arthur Edmond Clouston", Aeroplane Monthly, February 1984
Henshaw, Alex. "Personal Album", Aeroplane Monthly, November 1984
Lewis,Peter. 1970. British Racing and Record-Breaking Aircraft. Putnam. 
Middleton, Don. "Test Pilot Profile No.4 – A.E.Clouston", Aeroplane Monthly, October 1982
Oliver, David. 1994. Hendon Aerodrome – A History. Airlife 
Orange, Vincent. 2004. Clouston, Arthur Edmond (1908–1984). Oxford Dictionary of National Biography.

1908 births
1984 deaths
Britannia Trophy winners
British test pilots
Companions of the Order of the Bath
Recipients of the Air Force Cross (United Kingdom)
Royal Air Force officers
Royal Air Force personnel of World War II
Segrave Trophy recipients
People from Motueka
New Zealand emigrants to the United Kingdom
Companions of the Distinguished Service Order
Recipients of the Distinguished Flying Cross (United Kingdom)
British aviation record holders